ThinkCERCA is a Chicago-based startup company that produces literacy courseware for elementary through high school students. The company has undergone various rounds of venture capital funding.

Leadership
Eileen Murphy Buckley serves as Founder and CEO.

Abby Ross serves as Co-Founder and Chief Product Officer 

Daniel White has served as Chief Revenue Officer since January 2018 

Mike Grzelakowski has served as Chief Operating Officer since March 2018

References

External links
 Official site

Companies based in Chicago
Software companies of the United States